Hamble James Leacock (1795–1856) was an African missionary.  He was born in Barbados, where his father John Wrong Leacock was a slaveholder. He was educated at Codrington College, St John, Barbados.

Leacock became a clergyman and gave the privileges of the Church to all slaves of his parish, at the same time freeing his own slaves.  Difficulty with his Bishop, insurrection of slaves and depreciation in the value of property encouraged him to move to the United States, where he settled in Kentucky, Tennessee, and in New Jersey.  In October 1855 together with John Weeks (bishop) he sailed from Plymouth in England for Sierra Leone as a missionary of the West Indian Church Association, and founded a mission station in what is now the Anglican Diocese of Gambia at Rio Pongas. He became very ill and eventually returned to Freetown to convalesce, but died there on 20 August 1856.

Publications
 Henry Caswell, The Martyr of the Pongas, (New York, 1857)

References

External links
 ANGLICAN HISTORY
 

American Protestant missionaries
Barbadian Protestant missionaries
Barbadian emigrants to the United States
Anglican missionaries in Sierra Leone
1795 births
1856 deaths
African-American missionaries
Alumni of Codrington College